The following is a list of soldier beetle (family Cantharidae) species recorded in Great Britain. For other beetles, see List of beetle species recorded in Britain.

Podabrus alpinus (Paykull, 1798)
Ancistronycha abdominalis (Fabricius, 1798)
Cantharis cryptica Ashe, 1947
Cantharis decipiens Baudi, 1871
Cantharis figurata Mannerheim, 1843
Cantharis fusca Linnaeus, 1758
Cantharis lateralis Linnaeus, 1758
Cantharis livida Linnaeus, 1758
Cantharis nigra (De Geer, 1774)
Cantharis nigricans (O. F. Müller, 1776)
Cantharis obscura Linnaeus, 1758
Cantharis pallida Goeze, 1777
Cantharis paludosa Fallén, 1807
Cantharis pellucida Fabricius, 1792
Cantharis rufa Linnaeus, 1758
Cantharis rustica Fallén, 1807
Cantharis thoracica (Olivier, 1790)
Rhagonycha elongata (Fallén, 1807)
Rhagonycha fulva (Scopoli, 1763)
Rhagonycha lignosa (O. F. Müller, 1764)
Rhagonycha limbata C. G. Thomson, 1864
Rhagonycha lutea (O. F. Müller, 1764)
Rhagonycha testacea (Linnaeus, 1758)
Rhagonycha translucida (Krynicki, 1832)
Silis ruficollis (Fabricius, 1775)
Malthinus balteatus Suffrian, 1851
Malthinus flaveolus (Herbst, 1786)
Malthinus frontalis (Marsham, 1802)
Malthinus seriepunctatus Kiesenwetter, 1852
Malthodes crassicornis (Mäklin, 1846)
Malthodes dispar (Germar, 1824)
Malthodes fibulatus Kiesenwetter, 1852
Malthodes flavoguttatus Kiesenwetter, 1852
Malthodes fuscus (Waltl, 1838)
Malthodes guttifer Kiesenwetter, 1852
Malthodes lobatus Kiesenwetter, 1852
Malthodes marginatus (Latreille, 1806)
Malthodes maurus (Laporte, 1840)
Malthodes minimus (Linnaeus, 1758)
Malthodes mysticus Kiesenwetter, 1852
Malthodes pumilus (Brébisson, 1835)

References

Soldier beetles